Alka Rai is an Indian politician associated with the Bharatiya Janata Party (BJP). Alka Rai contested the Uttar Pradesh assembly election held in 2017. She got elected from the Mohammadabad constituency by defeating Sibakatullah Ansari with a margin of more than one lakh votes.

She claimed that her husband Krishnanand Rai was allegedly murdered by Mukhtar Ansari but later in 2019 Mukhtar Ansari was found not guilty. The person she defeated in the elections was Ansari's brother. However this is not the first victory of Alka Rai in an assembly election. She defeated her rival in the by-poll of year 2005, when her husband was shot dead. In the by-poll of 2005 no one from Ansari family contested the election. However they pitched Sri Krishan urf Gama Ram in the contest and supported him. Krisan Kumar was defeated by Alka Rai with a margin of 33,744 votes.

Posts held

See also
Uttar Pradesh Legislative Assembly

References

Living people
Bharatiya Janata Party politicians from Uttar Pradesh
Uttar Pradesh MLAs 2017–2022
People from Ghazipur
Year of birth missing (living people)